The 2014 American Athletic Conference women's basketball tournament was the first annual conference tournament of the American Athletic Conference, one of the two leagues that resulted from the 2013 split of the original Big East Conference. The tournament was held March 7–10, 2014 in the Mohegan Sun Arena in Uncasville, Connecticut and decided the champion of the 2013–14 American Athletic Conference women's basketball season. The 10 conference members competed in a single-elimination tournament for an automatic bid to the 2014 NCAA tournament.

The American Athletic Conference originally consisted of the members of the "old" Big East which played Division I FBS football, plus several new members which also sponsored FBS programs.

Seeds
All the teams in the American Athletic Conference qualified for the tournament. Teams were seeded based on conference record, with a tiebreaker system used as needed. Teams seeded 7 through 10 had to play in the opening round, and teams seeded 1 through 6 received a bye to the second round.

Schedule
All tournament games were nationally televised on an ESPN network:

Bracket

References

American Athletic Conference women's basketball tournament
2013–14 American Athletic Conference women's basketball season
2014 in sports in Connecticut
College basketball tournaments in Connecticut
Sports competitions in Uncasville, Connecticut